The Alabama Academy of Honor recognizes one hundred living Alabamians for outstanding accomplishments and services to Alabama and the United States. By act of the Alabama Legislature, only one hundred living people may be members at any time. Up to ten additional members per year are elected by current members when honorees pass away, by majority vote in order of highest vote total. Any Alabama citizen or Academy member may nominate people for election. Living present and past governors of Alabama are automatically members of the Academy and do not count against the 100-person maximum. At any time, no more than twenty-five percent of the Academy's members may be politicians.

Supreme Court Justice Hugo Black was the only person to ever decline membership in the Academy, after a vow to refuse all honors.

Establishment
The Alabama Academy of Honor was created by the Alabama State Legislature on October 29, 1965, through Act 15 of the Third Special Session of the 1965 Legislature of Alabama. The Academy was intended to honor notable living Alabama citizens, since several organizations already existed in the state for posthumous recognition.

On March 10, 1965, Missouri native and Alabama citizen Emmett Bryan Carmichael wrote to Alabama Governor George C. Wallace to suggest modeling an Academy after Missouri's "Academy of Squires". The idea was postponed until Governor Albert P. Brewer revived interest in the legislation. On October 25, 1968, a committee appointed by Governor Brewer and chaired by Emmett Carmichael selected the first ten members (as well as four governors). On a somewhat annual basis, later elections selected several new Alabamians until the 100-person cap was reached.

Members by election year

Source:

2020

Jo Bonner---U.S. Congressman, 1st District of Alabama, 2003-2013

J. Gary Cooper----U.S. Ambassador to Jamaica, 1994-1997

Bryan Stevenson----Human rights advocate, founder of Equal Justice Initiative

2019

No inductees

2018

Walter Bell----banker, Alabama Insurance Commissioner

U. W. Clemon----1st African-American Federal judge in Alabama

Ann Florie-----public servant

D. Paul Jones, Jr.------banker

Stancil Starnes-------lawyer/insurance executive

2017

Kay Ivey----2nd female Governor of Alabama

Deborah Edwards Barnhart------CEO, Space and Rocket Center

Cynthia Tucker Haynes-------Journalist; 1st African-American editor of Atlanta Journal-Constitution

Cathy Sloss Jones------Real estate executive

2016

Jack Hawkins, Jr.-------Chancellor of Troy University

Claude Nielsen--------CEO, Coca-Cola

2015

Richard Arrington----1st African-American mayor of Birmingham, Alabama

Raymond Harbert------Investment firm chairman

Vincent "Bo" Jackson, Jr.------Sports legend (NFL/MLB)

Charles Krulak-----USMC general/business executive

Caroline Novak------Chairman of A+ Education Partnership

Randy Owen------Founding member of country music group ALABAMA

2014

Judy Bonner----1st female president of the University of Alabama

Tim Cook----businessman

John Croyle------businessman/football player

Jim Hudson, Jr.-------businessman

Margaret Porter-------Mayor of Mountain Brook, Alabama

Nick Saban-------head football coach, University of Alabama

Jeff Sessions--------U.S. Senator from Alabama, U.S. Attorney General

Edgar Weldon---------businessman

2013

Johnny Johns----businessman

Fournier J. "Boots" Gale III ----lawyer

Seth Hammett----businessman, college president, Alabama Speaker of the House

2012

Ralph Cook----lawyer

Jay Gogue------president of University of Auburn

Alice Lee-------sister of author Harper Lee; oldest practicing attorney in Alabama

Tommy Lowder------real estate

Beverly Phifer Wingard------business executive

James Stephens------business executive

2011

Robert Bentley------Governor of Alabama

Charles Anderson-----media executive, Books-A-Million

David Cooper----maritime business executive

John Denson II---lawyer

J.M. Jenkins IV----business executive

Barbara Larson----1st executive director of Leadership Alabama

John Lewis-----U.S. Representative, Georgia; civil rights advocate

Robert Witt-----president of University of Alabama

2010

John Buchanan------U.S. Rep., Alabama's 6th District

Elbert Drummond-----business executive

Carol Garrison-------president, University of Alabama Birmingham (UAB)

2009

Angus Cooper II------maritime business executive

Donald James------business executive

James Dean Martin-----U.S. Rep., Alabama's 7th District

Charles McCrary------chairman of Alabama Power

Frank Stitt--------renowned chef and cookbook author

2008

Vaughan Morrissette------civic leader/volunteerism advocate

William E. Smith, Jr.--------business executive

Odessa Woolfolk-------founder of Birmingham Civil Rights Institute

2007

Hank Aaron------sports legend (MLB); broke Babe Ruth's career homerun record

Leah Rawls Atkins-------educator/historian

Mike Goodrich------business executive

James Harrison, Jr.------pharmacist, founder and CEO of Harco, Inc. Drug Stores

2006

Regina Benjamin--------physician/Surgeon General of the United States

Miller Gorrie-------business executive

Bill Ireland-------business executive

Edwin Bridges-------director of Department of Archives and History

Wayne Flynt--------historian

2005

Fred Gray-------civil right attorney and legislator

Ted C. Kennedy------business executive

Richard Shelby------U.S. Senator from Alabama

Gail Trechsel------art museum director

2004

Bill Cabanis------U.S. Ambassador to the Czech Republic

Catherine Randall------educator

Hall Thompson------business executive/golf cart developer

Cameron Vowell------philanthropist

William Warren, Jr.------CEO, Children's of Alabama Hospital

2003

Bob Riley-----Governor of Alabama

Don Logan------business executive

Malcolm Portera-----education executive

Van Richey-------business executive

Kathryn Tucker Windham----author known for Jeffrey stories

2002

James Head------business executive/equal rights advocate

John Godbold------Federal judge, 11th Circuit Court of Appeals

George Murray-----civil rights advocate/Episcopal bishop/"Call To Unity"

Condoleezza Rice-----U.S. National Security Advisor/U.S. Secretary of State

Cordell Wynn------president of Stillman College

2001

Ann Reynolds-------president of UAB

Harper Lee---author of "To Kill A Mockingbird"

Sidney McDonald-----educator/legislator/business executive

Marvin Engel-----business executive

Thomas Meredith------education executive

2000

John McMahon, Jr.------business executive

William Muse-----president of Auburn

Sandral Hullett-----medical executive

Rosa Parks-----civil rights pioneer

1999

J. Mason Davis, Jr.------civil rights attorney

Drayton Nabers, Jr.-------insurance executive

Sabert Oglesby, Jr.-------pioneer in air pollution control

Don Siegleman-----Governor of Alabama

1998

Charles LeMaistre-------physician, chairman of M.D. Anderson Cancer Institute

Stanley Mackin-------bank executive

Lee Styslinger, Jr.-----business executive

Robert Weil-------business executive

1997

James Clark------mayor of Eufaula, Alabama/state legislator

Emory Folmar-----mayor of Montgomery, Alabama

Robert Luckie, Jr.-----advertising executive

Benjamin Russell-----timber executive

Herb Sklenar-----business executive

Larry Striplin------coach/athletic director, Belmont University

1996

Ann Bedsole----1st Republican female in Alabama House/1st female state senator

Thomas Bradford, Jr.------business executive

Frank Bromberg, Jr.------business executive

Alston Callahan-----pioneer in reconstructive eye surgery

Thomas Corts-----president of Samford University

Edward Friend III-----lawyer

William Spencer III------business executive

1995

Philip Austin-------education executive

Elton B. Stephens------business executive

E.O. Wilson--------world renowned scientist in field of ecology

1994

No inductees

1993

David Bronner------CEO, Retirement System of Alabama

Tom Carruthers-----lawyer

James E. Folsom, Jr.-------Governor of Alabama

Elmer Harris-----CEO, Alabama Power

Earl Sayers------president, University of Alabama

1992

No inductees

1991

Harry Ayers-------Publisher, Anniston Star

Basil Hirschowitz------scientist, developed optical fiber for flexible endoscope

Barrett Shelton, Jr.-------newspaper executive

Bill Edmonds-----civil engineer, business executive

Frank Moody-----CEO, Alabama Power

Margaret Tutwiler-------noted U.S. State Department official

1990

Max Cooper----noted immunologist

Willard Hurley-----bank executive

Crawford Johnson III----CEO, Coca-Cola

James E. Martin----president of Auburn

Joseph Moquin-----business executive

1989

Houston Brice, Jr.-----business executive

Garry Drummond----business executive

Daniel McCall, Jr.-----Alabama State Supreme Court Justice

Holt Rast------business executive/state legislator

1988

Aaron Aronov------real estate developer

Carl Bailey-----CEO, South Central Bell

Eugene Gwaltney----business executive

Olin King-----business executive

Yetta Samford, Jr.------lawyer

James Wilson, Jr.----business executive

1987

Thomas Bartlett----educator, president of American University in Cairo

Claude Bennett----medical scientist/educator

Edward Friend, Jr.----corporate/real estate attorney

Guy Hunt------Governor of Alabama

Joseph Lanier, Jr.----business executive

James Lee, Jr.----business executive/CEO, Buffalo Rock

Ernest Williams----paper industry executive

1986
 Tom Bevill (1921-2005)---U.S. Representative (4th & 7th districts) of Alabama (1967-1997)
 Dr. Ira Lee Myers (1924-2008)---Alabama State Health Officer (1963-1986)
 Louis J. Willie, Jr. (1923-2007)---Insurance executive
 Wallace Davis Malone, Jr. (1936- )----CEO SouthTrust Bank
 Thomas Edward Rast (1920-2003)----Real estate executive

1985
 Joseph Sam Bruno (1912-1996)----Founder of Bruno's grocery store chain
 Emil Carl Hess (1918-?)----owner of the Parisian apparel chain
 William Jackson Edwards, III (1928- )---U.S. Representative (1st District), from AL (1965-1985); 1st Republican from this district since Reconstruction Era.
 William David Sellers, Jr. (1913-1990)---Business executive & philanthropist

1984
 Wallace R. Bunn (1923-2011)---CEO of Bellsouth Corp.
 Joseph McConnell Farley (1927-2010)---Birmingham attorney, president of Alabama Power (1969-1989)
 John Witherspoon Woods (1931-2002)---Banking executive
 Oliver H. Delchamps, Jr. (1933- )---Director, U.S. Chamber of Commerce; heir to Delchamps grocery store chain
 Henry Calvin Goodrich (1920-2011)----Business executive; pres. of Southern Natural Resources

1983
 Charles Albert Boswell (1916-1995)---insurance executive, blind professional golfer, AL Commissioner of Revenue
 Harry B. Brock, Jr. (1925-2015)-----Financier and philanthropist
 John Key McKinley (1920-2014)---CEO of TEXACO
 Frank Arthur Plummer (1912-1987)---Banking executive.
 Frank Brooks , Jr. (1904-1992)---Banking executive
 Thomas E. Bradford, Sr. (1909-2002)----Chairman, Bradford Gipin Food Brokers
 Joseph Lamar Lanier (1906-2000)----Noted textile manufacturer
 William Flynt Nichols (1918-1988)---U.S. Representative, 3rd and 4th Districts (1967-1988)
 Joab Langston Thomas (1933-2014)---President of the University of Alabama

1982
 Young Jacob Boozer, Jr. (1912-2000)----Business leader and college baseball star (UA)
 Kenneth R. Daniel (1913-2008)--Business and railroad executive (inducted also in 2009)
 Glenn Ireland II (1926-2015)---Business executive. Alabama Commissioner of Mental Health.
 Prime Francis Osborn III
 Howard Earle Skipper (1915-2006)---Noted American oncologist
 Dr. Buris Raye Boshell (1926- )---Noted physician in the area of diabetes research.
 Jeremiah Andrew Denton, Jr (1924-2014)---U.S. Senator, Alabama (1981-1987); the first Republican to be popularly elected in Alabama since the direct election of U.S. Senators began in 1914, the first Republican senator since Reconstruction to represent Alabama in the U.S. Senate, and the first Catholic to be elected to statewide office in Alabama.
 Kirkman O'Neal (1890-1988)---founder of Oneal Steel.
 Dr. James Allen Pittman, Jr. (1927-2014)---dean of UAB Medical School.
 Mary George Jordan Waite (1917-1990)---president of Farmer's and Merchant's Bank of Cherokee County.

1981
 Travis Massey Bedsole (1913-2011)---Mobile, AL attorney for 60 yrs
 Charles Trueheart Clayton (1911-?)---President, Liberty National Insurance
 William Houston Blount (1922-2011)----Philanthropist, president of Vulcan Materials
 Conrad Murphree Fowler (1918-2007)----Probate Judge of Shelby County, special prosecutor for "Phenix City Cleanup" (1954)

1980
Dr. John M. Chenault (1914-1992)----President of Decatur General Hospital
 William Hulsey (1901-1985)---Investment banker and art collector
 Kench Lott, Jr. (1920-1995)----President of Merchant's Bank (Mobile, AL)
 Frank Samford, Jr. (1921-1986)----President of Liberty National Insurance
 Arthur Shores (1904-1996)----American civil rights attorney; Alabama'a "Drum Major For Justice".
 John Harbert III (1921-1995)---Founder and CEO of Harbert Construction
 Dr. Thomas N. James (1925-2010)---World renowned cardiologist 
 James Mills (1900-1998)----Editor, Birmingham Post (1950-1967)

1979
 Robert Bamberg, Jr., Alabama Commissioner of Agriculture & Industries (1959-1962)
 Neal Berte, president of Birmingham–Southern College (1976-2004)
 Walter Gewin (1908-1981), federal judge (1961-1981)
 James Hardin (1917-1998), director of State Department of Finance; director of State Department of Mental Health
 Joseph McCorquodale, Jr., state representative (1959-1983); state Speaker of the House (1971-1983)
 Forrest H. James, governor of Alabama (1979-1983, 1995-1999)
 Frank M. Johnson, Jr. (1918-1999), U.S. federal judge (1955-1999) responsible for several landmark civil rights decisions
 Charles P. Rather, president of Southern Natural Gas
 Fran McKee (1926-2002), 1st female to hold rank of Rear Admiral in the U.S. Navy
 William Rushton III, insurance executive; CEO of Protective Life Corp.(1969-1992)

1978
 William D. Arant, Birmingham attorney
 Glen Brock, president of Gulf, Mobile and Ohio Railroad
 Alfred Delchamps, founder of Delchamps supermarket chain
 George LeMaistre (1911-1994), attorney/bank executive; chairman, FDIC (1977-1978)
 Seybourn Lynne (1907-2000), federal judge who decided Vivian Malone and James Hood civil rights cases
 John F. McRae, Mobile, community leader; responsible for helping to bring Senior Bowl to Ladd Stadium in Mobile
 Pelham J. Merrill (1907-1991), Associate Justice, Alabama Supreme Court (1953-1976)
 Bernard Monaghan (1916-1987), U.S. General Counsel of the Army (1952-1953) and CEO, Vulcan Materials (1959-1981)
 Armistead Selden, Jr. (1921-1985), U.S. Congressman, (1953-1969); U.S. Ambassador to New Zealand (1974-1979)
 Fred Sington (1910-1988), football player, Crimson Tide (1929-1930), professional baseball player (Brooklyn Dodgers/Washington Senators)

1977
 Ralph W. Adams (1915-1998), educator; president of Troy University
 John G. Galbraith (1914-1996), neurosurgeon
 John W. Bloomer, newspaper executive (Columbus Ledger); won Pulitzer Prize for coverage of clean-up of Phenix City
 Thomas B. Hill, Jr., Montgomery attorney
 John A. Cadell, attorney
 Robert E. Jones (1912-1997), U.S. Congressman, (1947-1963, 1965-1977)
 Walter W. Kennedy, Birmingham bank executive
 Emory Cunningham (1921-2000), publisher of The Progressive Farmer
 Carl Elliott (1913-1999), U.S. Congressman (1949-1965)
 Walter Frommeyer (196-1979), physician

1976
 Ehney Camp Jr. (1907-2009), Liberty National Life Insurance Company executive and banking expert
 R. Hugh Daniel (1906-1983), founder and CEO of Daniel International Org.
 John A. Hand, leader of the Alabama banking community for over 40 years
 Ruth Hanson (1900-1983), pioneer in the fight against diabetes in Alabama
 George Mattison, Jr., Birmingham industrialist and philanthropist
 Robert Parker, pediatrician
 Nell Rankin (1924-2005), operatic mezzo-soprano with Metropolitan Opera (1951-1976)
 Barrett Shelton (1903-1984), editor of The Decatur Daily (1924-1984)
 William M. Spencer, attorney; one of the founders of the Birmingham Museum of Art
 Jack W. Warner, president of Gulf States Paper; noted art collector

1975
 Rucker Agee
 James Browning Allen, U.S. Senator and 17th and 20th Lieutenant Governor of Alabama
 Joseph Linyer Bedsole
 Ben Screws Gilmer
 Milo Barrett Howard, Jr.
 Charles A. McCallum, Jr.
 Earl Mason McGowin
 George Mosley Murray, bishop who worked for civil rights and racial integration
 Julia Walker Ruseell
 William James Rushton

1974
 Clinton Jackson Coley
 Donald Comer, Jr.
 Luther H. Foster Jr.
 Howell Thomas Heflin, US Senator and Chief Justice of the Alabama Supreme Court
 Samuel Richardson Hill
 John Webster Kirklin, surgeon
 Thomas Seay Lawson
 J. Craig Smith
 Hudson Strode, author and university professor
 Luther Leonidas Terry, 9th US Surgeon General

1973
 Emmet Bryan Carmichael, biochemist
 Paul Grist, YMCA worker
 Forrest David Mathews, university president and 11th US Secretary of Health, Education, and Welfare
 Thomas Dameron Russell, businessman
 Frank Edward Spain, businessman
 Mervyn Hayden Sterne, businessman
 Ernest Stone, university president and Alabama Superintendent of Education
 Joseph F. Volker, university president
 Leslie Stephen Wright, university president

1972
 Tinsley R. Harrison, physician and author
 Ralph Jordan, football coach
 John C. Persons, US Army General and businessman
 Harry M. Philpott, university president
 Albert M. Rains, United States Representative

1971
No induction held.

1970
No induction held.

1969
 Winton M. Blount, United States Postmaster General
 Albert Preston Brewer, 47th governor of Alabama
 Paul W. Bryant, football coach
 James E. Folsom, 42nd governor of Alabama
 A.G. Gaston, businessman who worked for civil rights and racial integration
 Lister Hill, United States Senator
 Thomas H. Moorer, US Navy Admiral and chairman of the Joint Chiefs of Staff
 John Patterson, 44th governor of Alabama
 Frank A. Rose, university president
 Frank P. Samford, businessman and civic leader
 Bertha Smolian, philanthropist and civic leader
 John Sparkman, United States Senator
 Wernher von Braun, space scientist
 George C. Wallace, 45th, 48th, and 50th governor of Alabama

References

External links
 Official website

Alabama culture
Organizations based in Alabama
Halls of fame in Alabama
State halls of fame in the United States
Organizations established in 1965
Awards established in 1965
1965 establishments in Alabama